Dark Hollow Run is a tributary of Mud Pond Run in Pike County, Pennsylvania, United States.

References

Pike County, Pennsylvania